During the 1998–99 English football season, Watford F.C. competed in the Football League First Division.

Season summary
In the 1998–99 season, Watford's second successive promotion was achieved with a 2–0 victory over Bolton Wanderers in the playoff final, securing the club's promotion to the top flight for the first time since 1988.

Final league table

Results
Watford's score comes first

Legend

Football League First Division

First Division play-offs

FA Cup

League Cup

Players

First-team squad
Squad at end of season

References

Notes

Watford F.C. seasons
Watford